English singer Sam Smith has released four studio albums, one independent album, three live albums, one remix album, one soundtrack, thirteen extended plays, thirty-four singles (featuring on eight singles), and three promotional singles.

In the Lonely Hour, Smith's debut album, was released in May 2014. Smith debuted in October 2012 as a featured artist on English electronic duo Disclosure's single "Latch", which peaked at number 11 on the UK Singles Chart. In February 2013 "Lay Me Down" as the lead single from the album. In May 2013, they featured on Naughty Boy's single "La La La". The single was released on 19 May 2013 and peaked to number one in the UK. In October 2013 Smith released their first EP Nirvana. "Money on My Mind" was released as the second single from the album on 16 February 2014, the song peaked at number one on the UK Singles Chart. "Stay with Me" was released as the third single from the album on 14 April 2014, the song peaked to number one on the UK Singles Chart. "I'm Not the Only One" was the album's fourth single. It was released on 31 August 2014, peaking to number 3 on the UK Singles Chart. "Like I Can" was released as the album's fifth single on 5 December 2014, peaking at number 9 on the UK Singles Chart, becoming Smith's fourth consecutive top-ten hit as a lead artist in the UK.

A re-release of "Lay Me Down" was released as the sixth single from the album on 22 February 2015, peaking at number 15 on the UK Singles Chart. In the same month Smith recorded another version of the song, featuring John Legend, for the British charity television Comic Relief, the song reached number one in the UK. In July 2015, Smith was featured on Disclosure's single "Omen", peaking at number 13 in the UK. On 8 September 2015, Smith confirmed that their new song "Writing's on the Wall" would be the theme song to the 24th James Bond film Spectre. The song was released on 25 September 2015 and became the first Bond theme ever to go to number one in the UK. Smith's second album, The Thrill of It All, followed in 2017 and topped the charts in the United Kingdom, Canada, Ireland, the Netherlands, New Zealand, Sweden, and the United States. Its lead single "Too Good at Goodbyes" reached number one in the United Kingdom, Australia, and New Zealand and also reached the top 5 in Canada, Denmark, the Netherlands, and the United States.

Albums

Studio albums

Independent albums

Live albums

Remix albums

Extended plays

Singles

As lead artist

As featured artist

Promotional singles

Other charted songs

Other appearances

Songwriting credits

Guest appearances

Notes

References

External links
 Official website
 Website
 Sam Smith at AllMusic
 
 

Discographies of British artists
Pop music discographies
Discography